Hamdi Benani (1 January 1943 – 21 September 2020) was an Algerian singer and musician.

Biography 
Benani was born in Annaba in 1943. His uncle, encouraged him to start singing because of the quality of his voice and interpretive ability. He won his first prize while singing at the age of 16.

He first gained notoriety in 1963 with the song Ya Bahi El Djamel, which drove him to pursue a career in singing and violin. He brought new life to the Malouf genre of music with the tracks Mahbounati and Adala Ya Adala, which earned him great public success. This helped him be noticed by senior members of the Malouf singing community, such as Hassen El Annabi, Mohamed Tahar Fergani, and Abdelmoumène Bentobal.

Benani was nicknamed "l'ange blanc" (The White Angel) because he was always seen in a white suit with his white violin. He helped modernize the Malouf genre by using ancestral themes alongside modern instruments and new themes in the texts.

Benani's final work was a cooperation with Folktronica band Speed Caravan on recording their third album ''' in 2020.

Death 
Hamdi Benani died from COVID-19 in Annaba on 21 September 2020, aged 77, during the COVID-19 pandemic in Algeria.

References

External links 
 

1943 births
2020 deaths
Deaths from the COVID-19 pandemic in Algeria
People from Annaba
20th-century Algerian male singers
21st-century Algerian people